Lauge is a Danish surname. Notable people with the surname include:

 Lauge Koch (1892–1964), Danish geologist and Arctic explorer
 Michelle Lauge Quaade (born 1991), Danish road cyclist
 Rasmus Lauge Schmidt (born 1991), Danish handball player

See also
 Laug

Danish-language surnames